Rami Juhani Lehto (born 15 March 1973 in Lahti) is a Finnish politician currently serving in the Parliament of Finland for the Finns Party at the Tavastia constituency.

References

Living people
Members of the Parliament of Finland (2015–19)
Members of the Parliament of Finland (2019–23)
Finns Party politicians
21st-century Finnish politicians
1973 births